The Q Awards were the UK's annual music awards run by the music magazine Q. Since they began in 1990, the Q Awards became one of Britain's biggest and best publicised music awards. Locations for the awards ceremony included Abbey Road Studios and near the end of its life, The Park Lane Ballroom.

One of the more notable events of the awards was the ceremony of 2004, at which Elton John accused Madonna of cheating fans by miming on stage, after she had been nominated for a Best Live Act award. The 2001 event, was somewhat notoriously notable for Phill Jupitus stretching out the time it took to announce the "Best Producer" award, with him exclaiming "Best Producer?.... 'Would you like a cowbell in that?'", before being told off camera to get on with announcing the winner.

The Q Awards included many awards recognising a lifetime of achievement, rather than achievements over the year in question. In its last few years, the 'lifetime' awards have usually outnumbered the 'current' awards.

The awards came to an end when the magazine itself ceased publishing in 2020, blaming the COVID-19 pandemic. The 2020 awards ceremony would have been held at the Roundhouse and  seen a performance by Paul Heaton and Jacqui Abbott. When it was announced that the magazine was closing, Heaton was revealed to have donated a substantial amount of money to the magazine's former staff members. As thanks, and for his contributions to music as a songwriter, Heaton was presented with a final Q Award.

Results

2019

The winners of 2019 Q Awards are:
 Innovation In Sound: Dizzie Rascal
 Classic Album: Tricky – Maxinquaye
 Maverick Award: Edwyn Collins
 Play Award: Anna Calvi
 Outstanding Contribution To Music: Kano
 Classic Songwriter: Kevin Rowland
 Inspiration Award: Madness
 Icon Award: Christine And The Queens
 Hero Award: Kim Gordon
 Song Of The Decade: Lana Del Rey – "Video Games"
 Best Vocal Performance: Little Simz

2017
The winners of 2017 Q Awards are:
 Icon Award: Liam Gallagher
 Innovation in Sound: Wiley
 Gibson Les Paul Award: Kelley Deal
 Inspiration Award: Manic Street Preachers
 Maverick Award: Viv Albertine

2016
The winners of 2016 Q Awards are:
 Hero Award: Meat Loaf
 Classic Album: The Charlatans — Tellin' Stories
 Classic Songwriter: Ray Davies
 Innovation in Sound: M.I.A.
 Gibson Les Paul Award: The Edge
 Outstanding Contribution to Music: Blondie
 Hall of Fame: Madness

2015
The winners of 2015 Q Awards are:
 Hero Award: Mark Ronson
 Classic Song: Queen — "Bohemian Rhapsody"
 Classic Album: Soul II Soul — Club Classics Vol. One
 Innovation in Sound: Gary Numan
 Gibson Les Paul Award: Tony Iommi
 Outstanding Contribution To Music: New Order
 Icon Award: Duran Duran

2014
The winners of 2014 Q Awards are:
 Classic Album: Pink Floyd — The Dark Side of the Moon
 Maverick Award: St. Vincent
 Classic Songwriter: Andy Partridge
 Gibson Les Paul Award: Johnny Marr
 Innovation In Sound: Jean Michel Jarre
 Inspiration Award: Simple Minds
 Hero Award: The Charlatans
 Icon Award: Wilko Johnson
 Idol Award: Culture Club
 Outstanding Contribution To Music: Richard Russell

2013
The winners of 2013 Q Awards are:
 Classic Album: Happy Mondays — Bummed
 Classic Songwriter: Chrissie Hynde
 Spirit of Independence: Belle and Sebastian
 Poet Laureate: John Cooper Clarke
 Icon Award: Suede
 Idol Award: Robbie Williams
 Outstanding Contribution To Music: Pet Shop Boys
 Best Event: Glastonbury Festival
 David Bowie at the Victoria and Albert Museum
 The Killers at the Wembley Stadium & The Garage, LondonBattle Born World Tour
 Kraftwerk at the Tate Modern
 Latitude Festival
 The Rolling Stones at the Hyde Park, London50 & Counting

2012
The winners of 2012 Q Awards are:
 Classic Song: Dionne Warwick — "Walk On By"
 Classic Album: Manic Street Preachers — Generation Terrorists
 Spirit of Independence: The Cribs
 Innovation in Sound: Underworld
 Inspiration Award: Pulp
 Icon Award: Dexys Midnight Runners
 Hero Award: Johnny Marr
 Idol Award: Brandon Flowers

2011
The winners of 2011 Q Awards are:
 Next Big Thing: Lana Del Rey
 Classic Song: Snow Patrol — "Chasing Cars"
 Outstanding Contribution to Music: Siouxsie Sioux
 Icon Award: Noel Gallagher
 Innovation in Sound: Kaiser Chiefs
 Inspiration Award: Fat Boy Slim
 Hall of Fame: Queen
 Classic Songwriter: Gary Barlow
 Greatest Act of the Last 25 Years: U2
 Arcade Fire
 Arctic Monkeys
 Beastie Boys
 Björk
 Coldplay
 The Cure
 Damon Albarn
 Eminem
 Green Day
 Jack White
 Jay-Z
 Madonna
 Manic Street Preachers
 Metallica
 Muse
 Nirvana
 Oasis
 Paul Weller
 The Prodigy
 Radiohead
 Red Hot Chili Peppers
 R.E.M.
 The Strokes
 The Stone Roses

2010
The winners of 2010 Q Awards are:
 Hall of Fame: Take That
 Classic Songwriter: Neil Finn
 Next Big Thing: Clare Maguire
 Idol Award: Madness
 Hero Award: The Chemical Brothers
 Inspiration Award: Suede
 Innovation in Sound: Mark Ronson
 Classic Album: Wings — Band on the Run
 Icon: Bryan Ferry

2009
The winners of 2009 Q Awards are:
 Icon Award: Marianne Faithfull
 Idol Award: Spandau Ballet
 Inspiration Award: The Specials
 Innovation in Sound: Sonic Youth
 Classic Album: U2 — The Unforgettable Fire
 Classic Song: Frankie Goes to Hollywood — "Relax"
 Legend Award: Edwyn Collins
 Classic Songwriter: Yusuf Islam
 Outstanding Contribution to Music: Robert Plant

2008
The winners of 2008 Q Awards are:
 Classic Song: Meat Loaf — "Bat Out of Hell"
 Classic Songwriter: John Mellencamp
 Innovation in Sound: Massive Attack
 Outstanding Contribution to Music: David Gilmour
 Legend Award: Glen Campbell
 Inspiration Award: Cocteau Twins
 Idol Award: Grace Jones
 Icon Award: Adam Ant

2007
The winners of 2007 Q Awards are:
 Classic Song: Stereophonics — "Local Boy in the Photograph"
 Classic Album: The Verve — Urban Hymns
 Classic Songwriter: Billy Bragg
 Innovation in Sound: Sigur Rós
 Lifetime Achievement Award: Johnny Marr
 Merit Award: Ryan Adams
 Hero Award: Anthony H Wilson
 Legend Award: Ian Brown
 Inspiration Award: Damon Albarn
 Idol Award: Kylie Minogue
 Icon Award: Paul McCartney

2006
The winners of 2006 Q Awards are:
 Inspiration Award: a-ha
 Outstanding Contribution to Music: Smokey Robinson
 Groundbreaker Award: Primal Scream
 Icon Award: Jeff Lynne
 Idol Award: Take That
 Outstanding Performance Award: Faithless
 Classic Songwriter: Noel Gallagher
 Lifetime Achievement Award: Peter Gabriel
 Merit Award: Manic Street Preachers
 Innovation in Sound: The Edge
 Classic Song: Culture Club — "Karma Chameleon"
 Legend Award: The Who
 Award of Award: U2
 People's Choice Award: Arctic Monkeys
 Charity of the Year: War on Want

2005
The winners of 2005 Q Awards are:
 Inspiration Award: Björk
 Outstanding Contribution to Music: Paul Weller
 Icon Award: Jimmy Page
 Classic Songwriter: Nick Cave
 Lifetime Achievement Award: Bee Gees
 Innovation in Sound: The Prodigy
 Classic Song: Ray Davies — "Waterloo Sunset"
 Legend Award: Joy Division
 People's Choice Award: Oasis
 Best Producer: Gorillaz/Danger Mouse — Demon Days
 Birthday Honour: Michael Eavis
 Special Award: John Lennon

2004
The winners of 2004 Q Awards are:
 Merit Award: Shane MacGowan
 Innovation in Sound: The Human League
 Inspiration Award: The Pet Shop Boys
 Classic Songwriter: Elton John
 Icon Award: U2
 Lifetime Achievement Award: Roxy Music
 Best Producer: Mick Jones (The Libertines — The Libertines)
 Jerry Finn (Morrissey — You Are the Quarry)
 The Neptunes (Kelis — Tasty)
 Rich Costey, John Cornfield, Muse and Paul Reeve (Muse — Absolution)
 Scissor Sisters (Scissor Sisters — Scissor Sisters)
 Bobby Ross Avila, Bryan-Michael Cox, Destro Music, Dre & Vidal,James "Big Jim" Wright, Jermaine Dupri, Jimmy Jam and Terry Lewis,Just Blaze, Lil Jon, L.A. Reid, Rich Harrison, Robin Thicke, Usher (Usher — Confessions)

2003
The winners of 2003 Q Awards are:
 Inspiration Award: The Cure
 Icon Award: Jane's Addiction
 Classic Songwriter: Dexys Midnight Runners
 Lifetime Achievement Award: Duran Duran
 Special Award: Scott Walker
 Innovation in Sound: Muse
 David Gray
 Goldfrapp
 Richard X
 Super Furry Animals
 Best Producer: Nigel Godrich (Radiohead — Hail to the Thief)
 Blur / Ben Hillier (Blur — Think Tank)
 Dr. Dre (50 Cent — Get Rich or Die Tryin')
 Ethan Johns (Kings of Leon — Youth & Young Manhood)
 Pharrell Williams (The Neptunes — Clones)

2002
The winners of 2002 Q Awards are:
 Classic Songwriter: Jimmy Cliff
 Special Award: Depeche Mode
 Merit Award: Elvis Costello
 Inspiration Award: Echo & the Bunnymen
 Best Producer:Moby (Moby — 18)
 Rick Rubin (Red Hot Chili Peppers — By the Way)
 Tony Visconti (David Bowie — Heathen)
 Ken Nelson and Mark Pythian (Coldplay — A Rush of Blood to the Head)
 Weezer and Tom Lord-Alge (Weezer — Maladroit)

2001
The winners of 2001 Q Awards are:
 Classic Songwriter: Kate Bush
 Special Award: Brian Eno
 Merit Award: Elvis Costello
 Inspiration Award: John Lydon
 People's Choice Award: U2
 Best Producer: Nigel Godrich (Radiohead — Amnesiac)
 Brian Eno and Daniel Lanois (U2 — All That You Can't Leave Behind)
 Chris Shaw (Super Furry Animals — Rings Around the World)
 Dan the Automator (Gorillaz — Gorillaz)
 John Leckie (Muse — Origin of Symmetry)
 Pat McCarthy (R.E.M. — Reveal)

2000
The winners of 2000 Q Awards are:
 Merit Award: Jerry Dammers
 Songwriter Award: Guy Chambers and Robbie Williams
 Inspiration Award: Joe Strummer
 Best Producer: Artful Dodger (Artful Dodger — It's All About the Stragglers)
 Dave Eringa and George Brakoulias (Toploader — Onka's Big Moka)
 Dr. Dre (Eminem — The Marshall Mathers LP)
 Guy Chambers and Steve Power (Robbie Williams — Sing When You're Winning)
 Ross Robinson (Slipknot — Slipknot)

1999
The winners of 1999 Q Awards are:
 Classic Songwriter: Ian Dury and Chaz Jankel
 Best Producer: William Orbit
 Inspiration Award: New Order
 Special Merit Award: Keith Richards

1998
The winners of 1998 Q Awards are:
 Songwriter Award: Paul Weller
 Inspiration Award: Blondie
 Lifetime Achievement Award: R.E.M.
 Best Producer: Fatboy Slim (Fatboy Slim — You've Come a Long Way, Baby)
 Billy Corgan (The Smashing Pumpkins — "Adore")
 Mike Hedges (Manic Street Preachers — "This Is My Truth Tell Me Yours")
 Neil Finn (Neil Finn — "Try Whistling This")
 William Orbit (Madonna — "Ray of Light")

1997
The winners of 1997 Q Awards are:
 Best Producer: Nellee Hooper
 Best Reissue/Compilation: Various Artists — The Songs of Jimmie Rodgers
 Songwriter Award: Paul McCartney
 Inspiration Award: Patti Smith
 Lifetime Achievement Award: The Who
 Special Award: Phil Spector

1996
The winners of 1996 Q Awards are:
 Best Producer: John Leckie
 Best Reissue/Compilation: The Beatles — The Beatles Anthology
 Inspiration Award: U2
 Lifetime Achievement Award: Rod Stewart
 Merit Award: Elvis Costello

1995
The winners of 1995 Q Awards are:
 Best Producer: Tricky
 Best Reissue/Compilation: Various Artists — The Help Album
 Inspiration Award: David Bowie / Brian Eno
 Merit Award: Eric Clapton
 Songwriter Award: Van Morrison

1994
The winners of 1994 Q Awards are:
 Best Producer: Stephen Street
 Best Reissue/Compilation: Various Artists — The Tougher than Tough
 Inspiration Award: The Kinks
 Merit Award: U2
 Songwriter Award: Morrissey

1993
The winners of 1993 Q Awards are:
 Best Producer: Flood Brian Eno The Edge/Zooropa
 Best Reissue/Compilation: The Beach Boys — Good Vibrations: Thirty Years of The Beach Boys
 Inspiration Award: Donald Fagen
 Merit Award: Elton John
 Songwriter Award: Neil Finn

1992
The winners of 1992 Q Awards are:
 Best Producer: Daniel Lanois Peter Gabriel The Orb
 Best Reissue/Compilation: Bob Marley — Songs of Freedom
 Inspiration Award: B.B. King
 Merit Award: Led Zeppelin
 Songwriter Award: Neil Finn

1991
The winners of 1991 Q Awards are:
 Best Producer: Trevor Horn (Seal — Seal)
 Merit Award: Lou Reed
 Songwriter Award: Richard Thompson

1990
The winners of 1990 Q Awards are:
 Best Producer: Paul Oakenfold / Steve Osborne (Happy Mondays — Pills 'n' Thrills and Bellyaches)
 Best Reissue/Compilation: The Beach Boys — Pet Sounds
 Merit Award: Paul McCartney
 Songwriter Award: Prince

Criticism
At the 2006 Q Awards, Arctic Monkeys frontman Alex Turner criticised the choice of Take That for the "Idol" award.  Commenting on the winners of the night, he said:

References

External links
The Q Awards 2007 official site 
The Q Awards 1990-2004 Results
The Q Awards 1990-2005 Results

British music awards